Raghunathganj High School (10+2) is a high school situated at Raghunathganj, Murshidabad in the Indian state of West Bengal.

About School
The school was established in 1949. It offers secondary and higher secondary courses in arts and sciences. Raghunathganj High School (H.S.) is a government sponsored school. Up to class X, the school is for the boys only and the Higher Secondary section is for both boys and girls. The school is situated at a prime location of Raghunathganj town, under the Jangipur Sub-Division of Murshidabad district.

See also
Education in India
List of schools in India
Education in West Bengal

References

High schools and secondary schools in West Bengal
Schools in Murshidabad district
Educational institutions in India with year of establishment missing
Educational institutions established in 1949